Justus Cornelias Dirks (1911-2001) was a writer from South Africa.

History
Dirks was born on 28 February 1911 in Volksrust, Transvaal, South Africa to Justus Dirks and Cornelia Petronella Herselmann. He married Elsje Christina van Niekerk on 7 July 1939. The couple had two children. Dirks died on 15 October 2001, in Johannesburg, Gauteng, South Africa.

Education
Having passed standard 10 (grade 12) in 1928 at Volksrust High School, Dirks studied from 1929 to 1937 at the Potchefstroom University for Christian Higher Education and obtained a BA (History and English), MA (History) and a diploma in Education.

Career
From 1934 to 1973 Dirks taught at schools in Duiwelskloof, Potchefstroom, Belfast, Boksburg and Johannesburg. He was Vice-Headmaster at Voortrekker High School in Boksburg and Headmaster of Linden High School, in Johannesburg for 18 years.

Writing
In addition to books, other writings were published or broadcast:
short stories in magazines and newspapers namely Die Jongspan, Die Naweek, Die Brandwag, Die Huisgenoot, Die Huisvrou, Die Ruiter and 10-Plus, 
a drama, televised by the SABC during South Africa's first day of television in 1976, named Die Dubbele Alibi (translated from Afrikaans: The Double Alibi),
a series: Die Honde van Donkerkrans (translated: The Dogs of Dark Cliff), broadcast on radio in 1976.

Books written:

Note: "The Owls and the Otters" refer to a group of friends and their adventures. Joof is a boy's name.

Recognition
Linden High School named a building after him.
He received an academic award in 1999 at the Aardklop Art Festival in Potchefstroom for his contribution to children's literature.

References 

1911 births
2001 deaths
North-West University alumni
Afrikaans-language writers
South African male novelists
South African children's writers
People from Johannesburg